The discography of Martin Nievera, a Filipino singer-producer, consists of twenty three studio albums, two holiday albums and two live albums as of 2012.

Albums

Studio albums

Holiday albums

Live albums

Extended plays

Compilation albums

Box sets

Songs

Original songs (in alphabetical order, as solo artist)
 "A Brand New Christmas"
 "Buhay Mo, Buhay Ko" (inspirational song and tribute to Coronavirus pandemic in the Philippines)
 "Christmas Won't Be the Same Without You" (also covered by Pops Fernandez, Sarah Geronimo and Lani Misalucha)
 "Each Day with You" (covered by Nyoy Volante)
 "Forever (duet with Regine Velasquez, also covered by Passage Band)
 "Giliw" 
 "Hanggang Kailan" 
 "How Can I"
 "I'll Be There for You" (also covered by Aiza Seguerra, Juris Fernandez and Jake Zyrus)
 "Ikaw ang Aking Pangarap"
 "Ikaw ang Lahat sa Akin" (also covered by Gary Valenciano)
 "Ikaw Lamang" (theme from ABS-CBN TV series Nasaan Ka Elisa)
 "It's Christmas Time"
 "On the Right Track"
 "Pag Uwi" (Grand Prize Winner, 2001 Metro Pop Song Festival)
 "Pain" (Grand Prize Winner, 1983 Metro Pop Song Festival; also covered by Lea Salonga)
 "Paradise"
 "Please Don't Throw My Love Away"
 "You Are My Life" (English version of "Buhay Mo, Buhay Ko")
 "You Are My Song" (also covered by Regine Velasquez)
 "You Are to Me"

Cover versions
 "Be My Lady" (originally by Pedritto Montaire; also covered by Matt Monroe Sr., Marco Sison and Jason Dy)
 "Say That You Love Me" (originally by Basil Valdez)
 "Kahit Isang Saglit" (originally by Vernie Varga)
 "Ikaw" (originally by Sharon Cuneta)
 "Because of You" (originally by Keith Martin; also covered by Jed Madela, Gary Valenciano, Kyla and Paolo Santos)
 "We Are the Reason" (also covered by Gary Valenciano)
 "Now and Forever" (originally by Richard Marx)
 "Come What May" (originally by Air Supply; also covered by Sharon Cuneta) 
 "Maybe This Time" (originally by Michael Martin Murphy)
 "On the Wings of Love" (originally by Jeffrey Osborne)
 "Everything I Do (I Do It For You)" (originally by Bryan Adams) 
 "You're My Everything" (originally by Santa Esmeralda)
 "Forever" (originally by Kenny Loggins)
 "When I Met You" (originally by APO Hiking Society)
 "Ikaw Lang ang Mamahalin" (originally by Joey Albert; also covered by Joey Generoso and Lani Misalucha)
 "Closer You and I" (originally by Gino Padilla)
 "Somewhere Down the Road" (originally by Barry Manilow)
 "Goodbye Girl" (originally by David Gates)
 "Right Here Waiting" (originally by Richard Marx; also covered by Sarah Geronimo)
 "Just Once" (originally by James Ingram; also covered by Jaya Ramsey)
 "Only Selfless Love 2" (also covered by Jamie Rivera, Jerome John Hughes and Karylle)
 "Narito" (originally by Gary Valenciano)
 "Iisa Pa Lamang" (originally by Joey Albert; also covered by Erik Santos and Gabby Concepcion)
 "Kung Ako Na Lang Sana" (originally by Bituin Escalante; also covered by Sharon Cuneta)
 "Before I Let You Go" (originally by Freestyle)
 "Can't Take My Eyes Off You" (originally by Frankie Valli)
 "Of All the Things" (originally by Dennis Lambert; also covered by Regine Velasquez)
 "The Search Is Over" (originally by Survivor; also covered by Rachelle Ann Go and Jed Madela)
 "Babalik Kang Muli" (originally by Regine Velasquez)
 "Habang May Buhay" (originally by AfterImage; also covered by Jaya Ramsey, Regine Velasquez, Sharon Cuneta and Angeline Quinto)
 "Bakit Labis Kitang Mahal" (originally by the Boyfriends; also covered by Lea Salonga and Dingdong Avanzado)
 "Kapalaran" (originally by Rico J. Puno; also covered by Radioactive Sago Project)
 "Sa Kanya" (originally by Ogie Alcasid; also covered by Zsa Zsa Padilla and M.Y.M.P.)
 "Pangako" (originally by Ogie Alcasid with Manilyn Reynes; also covered by Regine Velasquez)
 "After All" (originally by Peter Cetera and Cher; also covered by Vina Morales as the theme from the ABS-CBN TV series A Beautiful Affair)
 "The Times of Your Life" (originally by Paul Anka)
 "Maging Sino Ka Man" (originally by Rey Valera; also covered by Sharon Cuneta and Erik Santos)
 "Bato sa Buhangin" (originally by Cinderella; also covered by Ogie Alcasid and Juan Pablo Dream)
 "Gaano Kita Kamahal" (originally by Celeste Legaspi; also covered by Itchyworms)
 "Di Na Muli" (originally by Itchyworms; also covered by Janine Teñoso)
 "Maalala Mo Kaya" (originally by Dulce; also covered by Carol Banawa and Gary V.)
 "Kapantay Ay Langit" (originally by Amapola; also covered by Pilita Corrales and Janno Gibbs (feat. Pilita Corrales))
 "I Think I'm in Love" (originally by Kuh Ledesma; also covered by Marie Digby)

Compilation album appearances
 Gold Ito! (Dyna Music, 1982)
 6th Metro Manila Popular Song Festival (Vicor Music, 1983)
 2001 Metro Pop Song Festival (Infinity Music "now GMA Music Music Philippines, 2001)
 Only Selfless Love 2 (Universal Records, 2003)
 OPM Rewind (Universal Records, 2004)
 Best of OPM Inspirational Songs (Universal Records, 2005)
 OPM Superstars Christmas (Universal Records, 2006)
 Remember the OPM in the 80s (Vicor Music, 2007)
 Yes FM! It's Christmas Time (Vicor Music, 2007)
 Life Songs & Life Stories with Boy Abunda (Star Records, 2008)
 OPM Love Album (Universal Records, 2008)
 Musika at Pelikula: A Star Cinema Music Collection (Star Music, 2008)
 No.1 Signature Hits OPM's Best (Vicor Music, 2008)
 GV 25: All Star Tribute (Star Music, 2008)
 Kris Aquino the Greatest Love (Universal Records, 2008)
 Christmas Memories (Viva Records, 2008)
 Hanep! Ultimate Pinoy Hits Collection (PolyEast Records Philippines, 2008)
 OPM No. 1's (Star Music, 2009)
 No. 1 Signature Hits OPM's Best Vol. 2 (Vicor Music Corp., 2009)
 Senti 3 (Viva Records, 2009)
 Paalam, Maraming Salamat Pres. Aquino (A Memorial Tribute Soundtrack) (Star Music, 2009)
 I-Star 15: Best of TV & Movie Themes (Star Music, 2010)
 60 Taon ng Musika at Soap Opera (Star Music, 2010)
 Senti Four It's Complicated (Viva Records, 2010)
 I Love You (Star Music, 2011)
 A Perfectly Acoustic Experience (PolyEast Records, 2011)
 Bida Best Hits da Best (Star Music, 2011)
 Biyahe Tayo (various artists) (2011)
 You're on the Right Track

References

External links
 
 
 

Discographies of Filipino artists
Pop music discographies